Arthur Hector M Isaac (born 1902, year of death unknown) was a Welsh amateur footballer who played as an inside forward in the Football League for Brentford.

Career statistics

References

Footballers from Swansea
Welsh footballers
Association football inside forwards
Ipswich Town F.C. players
Brentford F.C. players
English Football League players
Year of death missing
1902 births
Cambridge City F.C. players
Corinthian F.C. players
Casuals F.C. players
Isthmian League players